William Peters Robinson Sr. (March 15, 1911 – January 18, 1981) was an American university professor and politician who served as a member of the Virginia House of Delegates. On his death in 1981, he was succeeded by his son, Billy.

External links
 

1911 births
1981 deaths
Politicians from Norfolk, Virginia
African-American state legislators in Virginia
Democratic Party members of the Virginia House of Delegates
20th-century African-American people